The Direct Sales and Anti-Pyramid Scheme Act 1993, is a Malaysian laws which enacted to provide for the licensing of persons carrying on direct sales business, for the regulation of direct selling, for prohibiting pyramid scheme or arrangement, chain distribution scheme or arrangement, or any similar scheme or arrangement, and for other matters connected therewith.

Structure
The Direct Sales and Anti-Pyramid Scheme Act 1993, in its current form (1 December 2011), consists of 7 Parts containing 45 sections and 1 schedule (including 1 amendment).
 Part I: Preliminary
 Part II: Requirement for a Licence to Carry on Direct Sales Business
 Part III: Door-to-door Sales and, Mail Order Sales and Sales through Electronic Transactions
 Part IV: Direct Sales Contracts
 Part V: Cooling-off Period and Rescission
 Part VA: Prohibition of Pyramid Scheme
 Part VI: Enforcement
 Part VII: Miscellaneous
 Schedule

References

External links
 Direct Sales and Anti-Pyramid Scheme Act 1993 

1993 in Malaysian law
Malaysian federal legislation